The 2022 Ohio State Buckeyes football team represented Ohio State University as a member of the East Division of the Big Ten Conference during the 2022 NCAA Division I FBS football season. Led by fourth-year head coach Ryan Day, the Buckeyes played their home games at Ohio Stadium in Columbus, Ohio. It was the Buckeyes' 133rd season overall and 110th as a member of the Big Ten. 

On November 26th, #2 Ohio State faced their biggest rival, the #3 Michigan Wolverines, in a matchup of two undefeated teams and lost for the second consecutive time by a score of 45–23. However, Buckeyes were ranked #4 in the AP Poll after the then #4 USC Trojans were blown out by the Utah Utes, and were matched up against the defending (and eventual) national champions, the Georgia Bulldogs in the 2022 Peach Bowl, one of the two College Football Playoff games. The Buckeyes lost the Peach Bowl by a score of 41–42 after Noah Ruggles missed a 50-yard field goal attempt on the final offensive play of the game.

Previous season
The Buckeyes finished the 2021 season 11–2, 8–1 in Big Ten play to finish second place in the East Division. They failed to reach the Big Ten Championship for the first time since 2016 after losing to Michigan for the first time since 2011. The Buckeyes received a bid to the Rose Bowl where they defeated Utah on a game winning field goal, 48–45.

Offseason

Coaching staff changes

Coaching staff departures

Coaching staff additions

Transfers

Transfers out
The Buckeyes lost 19 players to the transfer portal.

Transfers in
The Buckeyes added three players via transfer.

Players drafted into the NFL

Preseason

Spring Game
The 2022 Spring Game was held at Ohio Stadium on Saturday, April 16, 2022, where the Scarlet team (offense) defeated the Gray team (defense), 34–26.

Schedule

Game summaries

vs No. 5 Notre Dame

vs Arkansas State

vs Toledo

vs Wisconsin

vs Rutgers (homecoming)

at Michigan State

vs Iowa

at No. 13 Penn State (rivalry)

at Northwestern

vs Indiana

at Maryland

vs No. 3 Michigan (The Game)

vs. No. 1 Georgia (Peach Bowl–CFP Semifinal)

Rankings

Roster

Staff

Awards and honors

References

Ohio State
Ohio State Buckeyes football seasons
Ohio State Buckeyes football